Tuxachanie Creek is a stream in the U.S. state of Mississippi.

Tuxachanie is a name derived from the Choctaw language meaning "fragments of hominy-boiling pots are lying there".

References

Rivers of Mississippi
Rivers of Harrison County, Mississippi
Rivers of Stone County, Mississippi
Mississippi placenames of Native American origin